(born 25 October 1986) is a retired Japanese tennis player. She turned professional in December 2003.

Biography
Fuda began playing at age five and was introduced to the sport by her father, Koji, a business owner, and mother, Atsuko. She speaks both Japanese and English and her favorite playing surface is hardcourt. She was coached by Masahide Sakamoto. Ryoko plays using her right hand. According to the WTA, she was introduced to tennis by playing on neighborhood courts.

In her career, Fuda won four singles titles and seven doubles titles on tournaments of the ITF Circuit.

ITF finals

Singles: 6 (4–2)

Doubles: 15 (7–8)

External links
 
 

1986 births
Living people
Japanese female tennis players
Sportspeople from Kobe
Asian Games medalists in tennis
Tennis players at the 2006 Asian Games
Tennis players at the 2010 Asian Games
Medalists at the 2006 Asian Games
Medalists at the 2010 Asian Games
Asian Games bronze medalists for Japan